Iheoma Amanda Nnadi   is an Igbo Nigerian beauty pageant titleholder who was crowned Most Beautiful Girl in Nigeria 2014. She represented Akwa Ibom state and represented Nigeria in the Miss World 2014 contest but Unplaced.

References

Most Beautiful Girl in Nigeria winners
Miss World 2014 delegates
Nigerian beauty pageant winners
1995 births
Living people
Igbo people